The abbreviation MRTS is most commonly used to refer to Mass Rapid Transit System.

The abbreviation MRTS may also refer to:
Magnetic Reversal Time Scale, a geological term
Marginal Rate of Technical Substitution, a term used in the study of economics..
Multi Radar Tracking System, a type of processing of one or more radar sensors in Air Traffic Control
Mec Roule Ton Spleef, on est là, MRIM RPZ
Mobile Response Trailer System, a system of shelters transported in a 53-foot wheeled trailer for use in emergency response...

See also
 MRT (disambiguation)